Zeller is a German surname. Notable people with the surname include:

Zeller
Adolf Guyer-Zeller (1839–1899), Swiss entrepreneur
Adrien Zeller (1940–2009), French politician
Alfred Zeller (1909-1988), American illustrator and painter 
André Zeller (1898–1979), French general
August Zeller (1863–1918), American sculptor and teacher
Bart Zeller (born 1941), American baseball player and coach
Bill Zeller (1983–2011), American computer programmer who was best known for creating the MyTunes application
Carl Zeller (1842–1898), Austrian operetta composer
Christian Zeller (1822–1899), German minister and creator of Zeller's congruence
Christoph Zeller (born c. 1956), Liechtenstein billionaire businessman
Christopher Zeller (born 1984), German field hockey player
Cody Zeller (born 1992), American basketball player, brother of Luke and Tyler Zeller
Dave Zeller (1939–2020), American basketball player
Dóra Zeller (born 1995), Hungarian footballer
Eduard Zeller (1814–1908), German philosopher
Ella Zeller (married name Ella Constantinescu), (born 1933), Romanian table tennis player, coach and administrator
Erich Zeller (1920–2001), German figure skater and figure skating coach
Ernie Zeller (1909–1987), American gridiron football player
Eva Zeller (1923–2022), German poet
Florian Zeller (born 1979), French novelist and playwright
Fred Zeller (1912–2003), French painter and politician
Fred R. Zeller (1899–1978), American politician
Fuzzy Zeller or Fuzzy Zoeller Jr. (born 1951), American golfer
Harry Zeller (1919–2004), American basketball player 
Heidi Zeller-Bähler (born 1967), Swiss skier
Gary Zeller (1947–1996), American basketball player
Jack Zeller (1883–1969), American baseball minor league player and later executive
Jerry Zeller (1898–1968), American football player
Jo Zeller (born 1955), Swiss racing driver
Joachim Zeller (born 1952), German politician who served as Member of the European Parliament (MEP)
Joe Zeller (1908–1983), American football player
John Zeller (1830–1902), German missionary
Joseph Zeller (1918-2018), American politician
Julius C. Zeller (1871-1938), American clergyman of the Methodist church, an educator, and a Mississippi Senator
Jules Sylvain Zeller (1820-1900), French historian
Karl Longin Zeller (1924-2006), German mathematician
Katrin Zeller (born 1979), German cross country skier
Ludwig Zeller Ocampo (1927-2019), Chilean poet and surreal visual artist
Luke Zeller (born 1987), American basketball player, brother of Cody and Tyler Zeller
Marcel Zeller (1973–2016), German boxer
Maria Isabel Wittenhall van Zeller (1749–1819), Pioneer of smallpox vaccination in Portugal
Martha Zeller (1918–2014), Mexican singer
Philipp Zeller (born 1983), German field hockey player
Philipp Christoph Zeller (1808-1883), German entomologist
Sam Zeller, American physicist
Sandro Zeller (born 1991), Swiss race car driver
Sanford Myron Zeller (1885-1948), American mycologist
Tom Zeller Jr. (born 1969), American journalist 
Toni Zeller (1909-????), German cross-country skier
Tyler Zeller (born 1990), American basketball player, brother of Cody and Luke Zeller
Walter Zeller (motorcyclist) (1928-1995), German motorcycle racer
Walter P. Zeller (1890-1957), Canadian businessman
Wolfgang Zeller (1893–1967), German composer noted for his film music

van Zeller
Dom Hubert van Zeller (1905–1984), Benedictine writer, sculptor, and (under the name Brother Choleric) cartoonist
João Van Zeller (born 1990), Portuguese footballer 
Mariana van Zeller (born 1976), Portuguese journalist and correspondent 

German-language surnames
Jewish surnames
German toponymic surnames